Crestline Exempted Village School District is a public school district serving students in the city of Crestline and Jackson Township in Crawford County, Ohio, United States. Also the school district extends into neighboring Richland County in parts of Sandusky Township.  The district enrolled 820 students during the 2007–2008 academic year.  A new facility for students of all ages opened in December 2012.

Schools

Elementary schools
Crestline Elementary School (Grades PK through 5th)

Middle and High Schools
Crestline High School (Grades 6th through 12th)

References

External links
Crestline Exempted Village School District website

School districts in Ohio
Education in Crawford County, Ohio
Education in Richland County, Ohio